Rui Chatrapati is a village in Parner taluka in Ahmednagar district of state of Maharashtra, India.

Religion
The majority of the population in the village is Hindu.
There is an old Peshwa time temple of Lord Shiva on the banks of the River Hanga.
There are people from various Castes like Mali and Maratha's. The common surnames include Divate, Shinde, Gaikwad, Karape, Baravkar, Mehetre, Sable, Nagare, Bhujbal.
There is a very good school Shri Dnyaneshwar Vidyalaya, Rui Chhtrapati which was started by Sarpanch of the village Mr. Sable and is run by a teacher Mr. Bansi Baravkar.

Economy
The majority of the population has farming as their primary occupation.

See also
 Parner taluka
 Villages in Parner taluka
Now Milk Dairy has also been one of the major occupation.

Femous temple Aadishakti tulja bhavani mata mandir at Rui-chhatrapatikar dam.

References 

Villages in Parner taluka
Villages in Ahmednagar district